The White Cafe, at 100 W. Sixth-sixth Ave. in Gallup, New Mexico, was built in 1928.  It was listed on the National Register of Historic Places in 1988.

It is Decorative Brick Commercial in style.

References

		
National Register of Historic Places in McKinley County, New Mexico
Buildings and structures completed in 1928